Kostyantyn Symashko (born 12 November 1980) is a Ukrainian Paralympic footballer who won two gold medals at the 2008 and 2016 Summer Paralympics.

References

External links
 

1980 births
Living people
Paralympic 7-a-side football players of Ukraine
Paralympic gold medalists for Ukraine
Paralympic silver medalists for Ukraine
Paralympic medalists in football 7-a-side
Medalists at the 2008 Summer Paralympics
Medalists at the 2012 Summer Paralympics
Medalists at the 2016 Summer Paralympics
7-a-side footballers at the 2008 Summer Paralympics
7-a-side footballers at the 2012 Summer Paralympics
7-a-side footballers at the 2016 Summer Paralympics